Thiago Henrique Sens (born July 2, 1985) is a Brazilian volleyball player who plays for Sporting CP.

Honours
 Brazilian Men's Volleyball Superliga: 2003-04 and 2012-13

References

1985 births
Living people
Brazilian sportspeople
Brazilian men's volleyball players
Sporting CP volleyball players